Sparasionidae is a family of wasps in the superfamily Platygastroidea. Known species are parasitioids of the eggs of orthopterans.

Taxonomy 

 Archaeoteleia Masner Burmese amber, Late Cretaceous (Cenomanian) Baltic amber, Eocene New Zealand, Chile, recent
 †Electroteleia Brues Baltic amber, Eocene
 Mexon Masner & Johnson Americas
 Listron Musetti & Johnson Americas
 Sceliomorpha Ashmead Americas
 Sparasion Latreille. Nearctic, Palearctic, Afrotropical and Oriental regions

References 

Platygastroidea
Hymenoptera families